Arthur Brasiliano Maia (13 October 1992 – 28 November 2016), known as Arthur Maia, was a Brazilian professional footballer who played for Chapecoense on loan from Vitória, as a winger  or attacking midfielder.

Maia was one of the victims when LaMia Airlines Flight 2933 crashed on 28 November 2016.

Club career
Born in Maceió, Alagoas, Maia joined Vitória's youth setup in 2003, aged ten, from CSA. He made his first team debut on 4 February 2010, coming on as a substitute in a 1–0 Campeonato Baiano home win against Feirense.

Maia's first goal came on 14 September 2011, in a 5–1 home routing of Duque de Caxias for the Série B championship. He was sparingly used during his beginnings at the club, however.

On 4 February 2013, Maia was loaned to fellow second tier club Joinville until December. His loan was cut short on 11 September, and he made his Série A debut with Vitória ten days later, in a 0–0 home draw against Grêmio.

On 12 February 2014, Maia was loaned to América-RN until the end of the campaign. He featured regularly for the club during the year, scoring a career-best seven goals in 36 appearances overall.

On 1 December 2014, Maia agreed to a one-year loan contract at Flamengo. Rarely used, he left the club the following 29 July and signed for Kawasaki Frontale, also in a temporary deal.

Maia returned to Vitória ahead of the 2016 season, but was loaned again on 12 May, now to Chapecoense. He scored his first goal in the top flight on 11 June, but in a 1–2 away loss against Ponte Preta.

Death
On 28 November 2016, when Chapecoense were en route to the first leg of the 2016 Copa Sudamericana Finals to play against Atlético Nacional, Maia was among the fatalities of the LaMia Airlines Flight 2933 accident in the Colombian village of Cerro Gordo, La Unión, Antioquia.

Career statistics

Honours
Vitória
Campeonato Baiano: 2010, 2016

América de Natal
Campeonato Potiguar: 2014

Chapecoense
Copa Sudamericana: 2016 (posthumously)

References

External links
 

1992 births
2016 deaths
People from Maceió
Brazilian footballers
Association football wingers
Campeonato Brasileiro Série A players
Campeonato Brasileiro Série B players
Esporte Clube Vitória players
Joinville Esporte Clube players
América Futebol Clube (RN) players
CR Flamengo footballers
Associação Chapecoense de Futebol players
J1 League players
Kawasaki Frontale players
Brazilian expatriate footballers
Brazilian expatriate sportspeople in Japan
Expatriate footballers in Japan
Footballers killed in the LaMia Flight 2933 crash
Sportspeople from Alagoas